is a former Japanese tennis player.

In her career, she won four singles and 18 doubles titles on the ITF Women's Circuit. In August 2013, she reached her highest singles ranking of world No. 287. On 12 May 2014, she peaked at No. 189 in the doubles rankings by the Women's Tennis Association (WTA).

ITF finals

Singles: 10 (4–6)

Doubles: 33 (18–15)

External links
 
 

1987 births
Living people
Japanese female tennis players
Sportspeople from Tokyo
20th-century Japanese women
21st-century Japanese women